The Roman Catholic Diocese of Kayanga is a diocese located in the city of Kayanga in the Ecclesiastical province of Mwanza in Tanzania. It was established August 14, 2008 from territory previously in the Diocese of Rulenge.

The diocese maintains 11 parishes, two schools, two hospitals and a health clinic. In addition to parish and administrative priests, three different communities of women religious minister in the diocese: the Religious Congregation of the Apostles of Unlimited Love Sisters (Masista Mitume wa Upendo Upeo), the Franciscan Sisters of St. Bernadette, and the Sisters of St. Therese of the Child Jesus.

Leadership
 Bishops of Kayanga (Roman rite)
 Bishop Almachius Vincent Rweyongeza (August 14, 2008 – present)

References

 GCatholic.org
 Catholic Hierarchy
 Bolla Congregatio pro Gentium, AAS 100 (2008), p. 597

Roman Catholic dioceses in Tanzania
Christian organizations established in 2008
Roman Catholic dioceses and prelatures established in the 21st century
2008 establishments in Tanzania
Dioceses of the Roman Catholic Ecclesiastical Province of Mwanza